The small-eared skink (Oligosoma stenotis) is found only on Stewart Island/Rakiura, New Zealand. It was first described in 1994 by Geoff Patterson and Charles Daugherty. It is a moderately small (80 mm snout to vent) skink, that lives in one of the most inhospitable (to lizards) environments on earth.

References

Oligosoma
Reptiles of New Zealand
Reptiles described in 1994
Taxa named by Geoff B. Patterson
Taxa named by Charles H. Daugherty